Guillermo Rubén Bongiorno (born 29 July 1978 in Mar del Plata) is an Argentine former professional cyclist.

Major results

2003
1st Stage 10 Tour de Langkawi
2004
1st Stage 10 Tour de Langkawi
2005
1st Gran Premio Città di Misano – Adriatico
1st Giro della Provincia di Reggio Calabria
 Tour de Langkawi
1st Stages 2 & 6
1st Stage 1a Settimana Internazionale di Coppi e Bartali
1st Stage 1 Settimana Ciclistica Lombarda
1st Stage 2a Brixia Tour
1st Stage 1 Regio-Tour
2006
1st Stage 2 Tour de Langkawi
2008
1st Stage 1 Tour of Turkey
 Danmark Rundt
1st Stages 1 & 4

References

External links

1978 births
Living people
Argentine male cyclists
Sportspeople from Mar del Plata